"In the Chapel in the Moonlight" is a 1936 popular song written by Billy Hill, and first performed by Shep Fields. 

Other successful recordings in 1936–37 were by Richard Himber, Mal Hallett and Ruth Etting. In France, the song is popularised by Leo Marjane and Lucienne Delyle.

Notable cover versions
"In the Chapel in the Moonlight" has been performed by many artists. Among the most notable are:
The song was revived in 1954 by Kitty Kallen, accompanied by the Jack Pleis Orchestra recorded at Decca Records on December 30, 1953. Her recording reached number four on the Billboard charts and number five on the Cash Box Best Selling Record chart. 
The Bachelors hit the Top 40 in the UK in 1965.
In 1967, Dean Martin's version peaked at number 25 on the Billboard Hot 100 as well as spending three weeks atop the easy listening chart in August 1967.

See also
List of number-one adult contemporary singles of 1967 (U.S.)

References

1936 songs
1954 singles
1967 singles
Dean Martin songs
The Bachelors songs
Songs written by Billy Hill (songwriter)